Wielichowo   is a town in Grodzisk Wielkopolski County, Greater Poland Voivodeship, Poland, with 1,830 inhabitants (2006).

References

Cities and towns in Greater Poland Voivodeship
Grodzisk Wielkopolski County